Koncert Beogradska Arena is the title of the first live album by pop singer-songwriter and producer – Željko Joksimović. The album consists of a DVD and CD which contains the footage shot from his concert held in the Belgrade Arena in April 2007. The CD contains the main theme from the TV series "Ono naše što nekad bejaše" and a gallery with Joksimović's newest photos as a bonus. It was released on 13 February 2008 by Minacord Records.

Track listing

DVD

 "Devojka"
 "Zovi Me"
 "Mila Moja"
 "Michelle"
 "Lutko Moja"
 "Pesma Sirena"
 "Nije Do Mene"
 "Istina"
 "Crnokosa"
 "Drska Ženo Plava"
 "Lane Moje"
 "Leđa O Leđa"
 "Pokloni se i počni"
 Paganini – "Caprice No. 24"
 "Supermen"
 Mix: "Varnice", "Karavan", "9 Dana", "Najmoje"
 "Habanera"
 "Lud i Ponosan"
 "Milo za drago"
 "Zaboravljaš"
 Ima Nešto U Tom Što Me Nećeš

CD

 "Devojka"
 "Zovi Me"
 "Mila Moja"
 "Michelle"
 "Lutko Moja"
 "Nije Do Mene"
 "Istina"
 "Crnokosa"
 "Drska Ženo Plava"
 "Lane Moje"
 "Supermen"
 "Varnice"
 "Karavan"
 "9 Dana"
 "Habanera"
 "Lud i Ponosan"
 Milo Za Drago
 Ima Nešto U Tom Što Me Nećeš
 Ono Naše Što Nekad Bejaše  (bonus track)

References

Live video albums
2008 live albums
2008 video albums
Željko Joksimović albums